Roland Krister Svensson (23 June 1945 – 20 March 2014) was a bantamweight Greco-Roman wrestler from Sweden who won a silver medal at the 1969 World Wrestling Championships. He competed at the 1968 Summer Olympics, but was eliminated in the second round. His father Egon competed in the same event at the 1936 Olympics.

After retiring from competitions Svensson worked as a coach with Finspångs AIK. In 1993 he was awarded the Frystadsmedal for his contributions to Swedish wrestling. He was a board member of the Swedish Wrestling Federation in the early 2000s.

References

External links
 

1945 births
2014 deaths
Olympic wrestlers of Sweden
Wrestlers at the 1968 Summer Olympics
Swedish male sport wrestlers
World Wrestling Championships medalists
Sportspeople from Malmö
20th-century Swedish people